First Lady of Ukraine ( or ) is the unofficial title attributed to the wife of the president of Ukraine.

List of first ladies of Ukraine

List of wives of leaders of the Ukrainian People's Republic

See also

Kyiv Summit of First Ladies and Gentlemen

References

External links
 International Charitable Fund "Ukraine 3000"  (Kateryna Yushchenko). Official website.
 National Foundation of Social Care for Mothers and Children - "Ukraine for Children" (Ludmila Kuchma). Official website.

Ukraine
First Families of Ukraine